Farewell, America is a 1951 propagandistic Soviet drama film directed by Aleksandr Dovzhenko.

Plot 
The film is based on the book by the American journalist Annabelle Bucar "The Truth about American Diplomats".

Starring 
 Liliya Gritsenko	
 Nikolai Gritsenko
 Grigori Kirillov as Walter Scott, American Ambassador in Moscow
 Janis Osis 
 Lyudmila Shagalova 
 Grigoriy Shpigel 
  as Hill, reporter
 Elizaveta Alekseeva as Meri Kuper (uncredited)
 Vera Orlova as Anna Bradford's Mother (uncredited)

References

External links 
 

1951 films
1950s Russian-language films
Soviet propaganda films
1951 drama films
Soviet drama films